John Joseph Dearin (ca 1818 – July 25, 1890) was a pharmacist and political figure in Newfoundland. He represented St. John's East in the Newfoundland and Labrador House of Assembly from 1873 to 1878, from 1882 to 1885 and from 1889 to 1890.

He was born in St. John's, the son of William Dearin and Elizabeth King. Dearin apprenticed with a pharmacist in St. John's and then worked in Harbour Grace. He returned to St. John's where he opened an apothecary shop with his brother in the 1840s. Dearin also practised as a dentist. He opposed union with Canada. He was defeated when he ran for reelection in 1878 and 1885. Dearin died in office in St. John's in 1890.

References 

Members of the Newfoundland and Labrador House of Assembly
Year of birth missing
1890 deaths
1810s births
Newfoundland Colony people